The Este culture or Atestine culture was an Iron Age archaeological culture existing from the late Italian Bronze Age (10th-9th century BC, proto-venetic phase) to the Roman period (1st century BC). It was located in the present territory of Veneto in Italy and derived from the earlier and more extensive Proto-Villanovan culture. It is also called "civilization of situlas", or Paleo-Venetic.

The culture is named after a proto-urban settlement in the Po Valley (Northern Italy). The city of Este was originally situated on the river Adige, which changed its course in 5th century; it was a center of metalworking. The settlement evolved in the beginning of the 1st century BC at the cross-way of important traffic routes. Essentially only the cremation cemeteries with their rich burial goods remained.

Este culture existed next to the Villanovan Culture in the Bologna area and the Golasecca culture in the West of the Po Valley. It was influenced by the Urnfield culture parallel to the Hallstatt period. Este had artistic and technical influence on the Hallstatt region to the north and Etruscan-Grecian elements to the south. Este was the center of the so-called situlae art. In particular, the situla decorated with animals and ribbons of human figures are characteristic of this culture. The most significant of these is the Benvenuti-Situla (600 BC).

The evolution of the bronze foil works can be traced to the end of the 4th century BC. Este culture survived the invasion of the Celts until it was absorbed into the Roman Empire.

Several archaeological discoveries provide evidence that Este was an important centre of Venetic culture from the 7th to the 4th century BC. They had a large shrine to the god or goddess Reitia and a school for scribes. Archaeologists found next to small bronze statues, tools, vases and money, some 200 inscriptions in the Venetic script and the so-called Alphabet Tablets.

The Veneti formed a buffer between the Illyrians, whose tribal area was located in the Balkans to the East of Trieste, and the Celts in the Po Valley. The Este had their own language and culture which became increasingly influenced by the Greek culture. The Veneti continued the tradition of the Este culture after the latter's disappearance.

Four historical phases are distinguished: Este I (from 900-750 BC); Este II (from 750-575 BC), which has an individual character; Este III (from 575-350 BC), the climax corresponding to Certosa; and Este IV (from 350-182 BC), showing Celtic influences.

Gallery

Literature
 Daniel Glyn (Hrsg.): Enzyklopädie der Archäologie. (Enzyclopedia of Archaeology). Published by Joachim Rehork. Nikol, Lübbe 1996, . (German)
 Douglas Q. Adams: Encyclopedia of Indo-European Culture. Taylor & Francis, 1997, p. 183 f.
 Dal paleolitico alla civiltà atestina / a cura di Raffaello Battaglia // Storia di Venezia / Centro internazionale delle arti e del costume. - Venezia : Centro internazionale delle arti e del costume, 1958 - Vol.1, p. 79-177 : ill. (Italian)
 Bermond Montanari 1999: G. Bermond Montanari, Gli strumenti musicali nell’arte delle situle. In: Protostoria e storia del „Venetorum Angulus“. Portogruaro – Quarto d’Altino – Este – Adria, 16-19 ottobre 1996. Convegno di Studi Etruschi ed Italici, Atti, 20 (Pisa/Roma 1999) 487-499. (Italian)
Di Filippo Balestrazzi 1980: E. Di Filippo Balestrazzi, Nuovi confronti iconografici e un’ipotesi sui rapporti fra l’area delle situle e il mondo orientale. In: Este e la civiltà paleoveneta a cento anni dalle prime scoperte. Atti del XI Convegno di studi etruschi e italici, Este - Padova 27 giugno - 1 luglio 1976 (Firenze 1980) 153-170. (Italian)

References

See also
Adriatic Veneti
Polada culture
Euganei
Canegrate culture
Golasecca culture
Prehistoric Italy

 
10th-century BC establishments
1st-century BC disestablishments
Archaeological cultures of Southern Europe
Archaeological cultures in Italy
Iron Age cultures of Europe
History of Veneto
Prehistoric Italy
Italic archaeological cultures